Khirasara is an archaeological site belonging to the Indus Valley civilization. This site is located in Nakhatrana Taluka of Kutch district in the western Indian state of Gujarat. It is located on the bank of Khari river. The site is 85 km from Bhuj, the district headquarter.

Excavations
During 1976-77 exploration, an Archaeological Survey of India official discovered a big cubical weight, chunks of pottery, sprinklers and spouts of red polished ware from the site. In December 2009, a team from the Vadodara division of the Archaeological Survey of India started excavation at this site after the discovery of a 300 m² fortification wall.

Findings
Specimens of fine perforated pottery were discovered from the site during the excavation. Seals found at this site are exhibited at Kutch Museum.

A "warehouse" found at the site had 14 parallel walls. The warehouse measured 28 metres by 12 metres while the walls had an average length of 10.8 metres and 1.55 metres breadth. Its structure above the walls was made of wood and daub. Houses have been found signifying beautiful residence of the community. Rectangular shaped rooms, connected to each other and furnace for cooking; and foundation pillars have also been found. The walls of the houses are made with bricks and mud. For making footpath outside the houses mud, pieces of vessels, shells and small stones have been used.

Bone pots (used to preserve ash and bones after death) and pieces of shells have been recovered from the rooms. Unearthed some fine specimens of perforated pottery, which will be matched with the items recovered from other Harappan sites in order to identify and date them. The ones found in the upper layer are likely to belong to a later period while the ones found in the deeper layer will be older. The "subsistence pattern," or the trade and livelihood options of the lost colony will also become known after further excavations.

It is known now that it was a major industrial hub of the mature Harappan period and it flourished from circa 2600 to 2200 BCE.

Survey instrument
The Archaeological Survey of India has recovered a survey instrument, comparable to modern prismatic compass, from the site called Gadh-vali vadi.

See also
 Indus Valley civilization
 List of Indus Valley Civilization sites
 List of inventions and discoveries of the Indus Valley Civilization
 Hydraulic engineering of the Indus Valley Civilization

References

Archaeological sites in Gujarat
Indus Valley civilisation sites
History of Kutch
Tourist attractions in Kutch district